Michael Seymour may refer to:

Sir Michael Seymour, 1st Baronet (1768–1834), British naval commander
Michael Seymour (Royal Navy officer, born 1802) (1802–1887), British naval commander, son of the above
Michael Seymour (production designer) (1932–2018), production designer
Michael Seymour (cricketer), South African cricketer commonly known as Kelly
Michael Hobart Seymour (1800–1874), Anglo-Irish Protestant clergyman and religious controversialist

See also
Sir Michael Culme-Seymour, 3rd Baronet (1836–1920), Royal Navy officer
Sir Michael Culme-Seymour, 4th Baronet (1867–1925), Royal Navy officer